Husevågøy is an island in Kinn Municipality in Vestland county, Norway.  The  island is mountainous with few trees.  The island lies in the mouth of the Nordfjorden, between the islands of Vågsøy and Bremangerlandet.  In 2018, there were about 50 residents on the island.  There is a car ferry that runs from the town of Måløy on Vågsøy island (to the north) to Husevågøy and then on to Oldeide on Bremangerlandet (to the south).

Historically, the island was part of the old municipality of Davik.  In 1964, Husevågøy and several small surrounding islands were transferred to Vågsøy Municipality. Then in 2020, the area became part of Kinn Municipality.

Media gallery

See also
List of islands of Norway

References

Islands of Vestland
Kinn